Dronero is a comune (municipality) in the Province of Cuneo in the Italian region Piedmont, located about  southwest of Turin and about  northwest of Cuneo at the entrance of the Valle Maira.

Main sights
Ponte Vecchio, also known as Ponte del Diavolo ("Devil's Bridge")
Torrazza, a watch tower

Culture
Dronero is the home of Droneresi al Rum,  a typical delicious sweet, made of two meringues and a heart of chocolate, rum and custard.

References

External links
 Official website